Karlo Belak (born 22 April 1991) is a Croatian football player currently playing for Lučko.

Club career
Belak joined NK Vrapče in 2019. He then had a spell in the Austrian lower leagues with Fürstenfeld.

References

External links
 

1991 births
Living people
People from Zagreb County
Association football midfielders
Croatian footballers
NK Rudeš players
NK Lučko players
FC Milsami Orhei players
First Football League (Croatia) players
Moldovan Super Liga players
Austrian Landesliga players
Croatian expatriate footballers
Expatriate footballers in Moldova
Croatian expatriate sportspeople in Moldova
Expatriate footballers in Austria
Croatian expatriate sportspeople in Austria